The Pine of Formentor is one of the most well-known and celebrated poems by Miquel Costa i Llobera. Technically, it is considered as the culmination of the Romantic poetry in the Catalan language.

History 
Miquel Costa i Llobera wrote the poem in Catalan language in 1875, during his first period of production. 

To compose it, he took inspiration from the majestic landscapes and  visions of the pine trees rooted in the cliffs of the Formentor peninsula on Mallorca island. Costa i Llobera frequented those sites from an early age. The landscape of Formentor portrayed by the poet is real, whilst also evolving into a literary category, becoming a symbol of the Mediterranean.

Years later, the poet published a version of the poem in Spanish.

Structure of the poem 
The poem is written entirely in alexandrine verses (6+6 syllables), with caesurae in the middle. It is composed of quintain stanzas, with an ABAAB rhyme. The last line of each quintain contains only 6 syllables. 

Its beginning is often quoted in Catalan:

Whilst Costa i Llobera himself would publish a translation years later, in Spanish. The same first stanza reads:

Legacy 
The poem has been sung, among others, by Spanish singer Maria del Mar Bonet. 
Artists such as Joan Miró and Hermen Anglada Camarasa used it as inspiration for their paintings.

See also 
 Miquel Costa i Llobera
 Formentor

References

Further reading 
 Cifre Forteza, Bernat. "Costa i Llobera i el món clàssic (1854-1922)". Lleonard Muntaner Editor, 2005.
 Bartolomé Torres Gost. "Miguel Costa y Llobera. 1854 - 1922. Itinerario Espiritual De Un Poeta". Editorial Balmes, Barcelona, 1971. 

1875 poems
Catalan-language works